Jorge Bartolomé Vargas y Celis (August 24, 1890 – February 22, 1980) was a Filipino lawyer, diplomat and youth advocate born in Bago, Negros Occidental, Philippines. He graduated valedictorian from Negros Occidental High School in 1909 and obtained a Bachelor of Arts degree in 1911 and a Bachelor of Law degree with honors in 1914, both from the University of the Philippines. He was a founding member of the Philippine Amateur Athletic Federation (now the Philippine Olympic Committee) in 1911 and served in its executive committee in 1918. He served as its second chairman from 1935 to 1955. He was also the first Filipino member of the International Olympic Committee.

Early life and education
Vargas was born on August 24, 1890 in Bago, Negros Occidental, Philippines. He graduated valedictorian from Negros Occidental High School in 1909 and obtained a Bachelor of Arts degree in 1911 and a Bachelor of Law degree with honors in 1914, both from the University of the Philippines.

Career and founder
He was a founding member of the Philippine Amateur Athletic Federation (now the Philippine Olympic Committee) in 1911 and served in its executive committee in 1918. He served as its second chairman from 1935 to 1955. He was also the first Filipino member of the International Olympic Committee.

Government service

After being admitted to the Philippine Bar in 1914, he was appointed as a law clerk for the Philippine Commission in 1915. He was promoted to the position of chief clerk of the Department of the Interior in 1917.

In 1918, he served as the legislative secretary to Speaker Sergio Osmeña of the House of Representatives.

In 1921, Vargas succeeded Vicente Morente as director-general of the Philippine Carnival Association which ran the Manila Carnival. He was succeeded by Arsenio Luz the following year.

In 1936, Vargas was appointed by President Manuel L. Quezon as his executive secretary, becoming the first in the country to serve in such a position.

When the Japanese invaded the country in 1941, Vargas was designated to the Department of National Defense as its secretary. A few weeks later, he was appointed by President Manuel Quezon as mayor of the City of Greater Manila in 1941. His responsibilities included administering the open city upon the arrival of occupational troops of the Imperial Japanese Army on January 2, 1942.

By 1942, Vargas became chairman of the Japanese-sponsored Philippine Executive Commission. During the collaborationist Second Philippine Republic, he was once asked by the Japanese to assume the Presidency, but he declined. He instead served as the regime's Ambassador to Japan. In that position, he was quoted shortly before Japanese troops were driven from Manila as stating that "we know Japan is destined for sure victory and prosperity for ages to come."

Vargas served as chairman of the National Planning Commission from 1946 to 1954 and was a member of the Board of Regents of the University of the Philippines from 1961 to 1965. In 1960, the Philippines conferred on him the Legion of Honor with the rank of commander.

Scouting

Vargas involvement with scouting started in 1935 when he became a member of the executive board of the Philippine Council of the Boy Scouts of America. Together with other Philippine scouting advocates, he became one of the charter members of the Boy Scouts of the Philippines in 1936.

Upon the death of Manuel Camus in 1949, Vargas was unanimously chosen by the National Executive Board to serve as the president and chief scout of the Boy Scouts of the Philippines. He served the position of national president until 1961. He became a member of the World Scout Committee of the World Organization of the Scout Movement from 1951 to 1957.

Vargas was awarded the Bronze Wolf in 1959 and received other awards including the Silver Tamaraw (Philippines), Silver Fox (Canada), Silver Ibex (Austria), Silver Wolf (UK), and in 1959 also received the highest distinction of the Scout Association of Japan, the Golden Pheasant Award. He also became the first recipient of the Tanglaw ng Kabataan (Light of the Youth) Award of the BSP in 1961.

Death
Vargas died on February 22, 1980, in Manila, Philippines at the age of 89.

Honours 
: Grand Cordon (1st Class) of the Order of the Rising Sun (October 1, 1943)

Gallery

See also

Jorge B. Vargas Museum and Filipiniana Research Center

References

Further reading

 
 

|-

|-

|-

|-

|-

1890 births
1980 deaths
Filipino civil servants
Ambassadors of the Philippines to Japan
Filipino collaborators with Imperial Japan
Filipino diplomats
20th-century Filipino lawyers
Filipino Roman Catholics
Mayors of Manila
Secretaries of National Defense of the Philippines
Executive Secretaries of the Philippines
Prime Ministers of the Philippines
People from Negros Occidental
Recipients of the Bronze Wolf Award
Scouting in the Philippines
University of the Philippines alumni
World Scout Committee members
Quezon administration cabinet members
Laurel administration cabinet members
KALIBAPI politicians